Alphonse of Toulouse may refer to:
 Alphonse Jordan (1105–1148), Count of Toulouse (1112–48) as Alphonse I
 Alphonse, Count of Poitiers (1220–1271), younger brother of King Louis IX of France, Count of Toulouse (1249–71) as Alphonse II